Kevin Austin Millwood (born December 24, 1974) is an American former professional baseball pitcher. He played in Major League Baseball (MLB) for the Atlanta Braves, Philadelphia Phillies, Cleveland Indians, Texas Rangers, Baltimore Orioles, Colorado Rockies and Seattle Mariners.

While with the Braves, Millwood was part of a pitching rotation which featured Greg Maddux, Tom Glavine and John Smoltz. In 1999 he was selected to his only All-Star Game and helped the Braves to the 1999 World Series and two seasons later the 2001 National League Championship Series. As a member of the Indians, his 2.86 ERA led all American League pitchers. In 2012, Millwood became the 67th pitcher to record 2,000 career strikeouts.

Early life
Millwood was raised by Kathy Coplen and Bill Millwood in Bessemer City, North Carolina. He attended Bessemer City High School where he played baseball, basketball and football. As a basketball player, he scored 1,000 points for the Bessemer City Yellow Jackets. Milwood missed the beginning of every high school baseball season in order to finish the basketball season and did not expect to be drafted by a professional baseball team.

Baseball career

Atlanta Braves
Millwood was drafted by the Atlanta Braves in the 11th round of the 1993 MLB draft. After four years in the minors, Millwood made his debut with the Atlanta Braves on July 14, 1997. A year later, he won 17 games. Millwood formed a part of the Braves' star pitching rotation, which also consisted of Greg Maddux, John Smoltz and Tom Glavine. According to Nate Silver, the 1997 Braves starting rotation was the best in the history of baseball as of the 2010 season.

The 1999 campaign was one of Millwood's best. He posted career-highs in wins (18, also achieved in 2002), ERA (2.68), strikeouts (205) and WHIP (0.996). He finished third in the National League Cy Young voting (losing to the Arizona Diamondbacks' Randy Johnson) and 26th on the National League MVP ballot. He was selected as an All-Star in 1999, his only appearance in the Midsummer Classic.

Philadelphia Phillies
Before the 2003 season, Millwood was traded by the Braves to the Philadelphia Phillies for catcher Johnny Estrada in order to cut their payroll in the midst of economic difficulties. He went 14-12 with his new team, including throwing a no-hitter against the San Francisco Giants on April 27 coming in the Phillies' final season at Veterans Stadium (this was one of only two no-hitters ever thrown at the now-demolished Vet). He also led the majors in stolen bases allowed, with 41.

Cleveland Indians
In 2005, Millwood signed a one-year contract as a free agent with the Cleveland Indians. He came back from injury well, leading the American League in ERA (2.86). However, he managed a record of only 9-11, due to poor run support. During 2005, Millwood again led the majors in stolen bases allowed, with 33. He finished tied for sixth in the balloting for the 2005 AL Cy Young Award.

Texas Rangers

On December 26, 2005, the Texas Rangers signed Millwood to a five-year, $60 million deal.

In 2006, he and Vicente Padilla won 15 games; a total not matched by a Rangers pitcher until Scott Feldman in 2009.

In 2008, when batters did hit the ball against him, it was with uncommon success, as his .358 batting-average-against on balls in play was the highest in the major leagues. 26% of all balls put in play against him were line drives, the highest percentage in the majors.

Baltimore Orioles
Millwood was traded to the Baltimore Orioles on December 9, 2009, for Chris Ray and a player to be named later (left-handed pitcher Ben Snyder, a Rule 5 pick from San Francisco).

During the 2010 season, Millwood went 4–16 with a 5.10 earned run average, leading the league in losses.

New York Yankees
On March 25, 2011, Millwood was signed to a minor league contract by the New York Yankees. After making three starts in the minor leagues, he opted out of his contract on May 1.

Boston Red Sox
Millwood signed a minor league contract with the Boston Red Sox on May 19, 2011. He was released on August 7, exercising an opt-out clause.

Colorado Rockies
On August 8, 2011, Millwood signed a minor league contract with the Colorado Rockies. Millwood was called up August 10 to fill a void after an injury to Juan Nicasio.

Seattle Mariners
On January 22, 2012, it was reported that the Seattle Mariners had signed Millwood to a minor league contract. He was called up from Triple-A and made his first major league start of the season on April 22 against the Chicago White Sox. On May 13, Millwood became the 67th pitcher to record 2,000 career strikeouts when he struck out Yankee Curtis Granderson. Millwood notched a win over Yankee starter Andy Pettitte, who was pitching in the majors for the first time since 2010.

On June 8, Millwood pitched the first six innings of a combined no-hitter against the Los Angeles Dodgers before leaving the game due to a groin injury. Charlie Furbush, Stephen Pryor, Lucas Luetge, Brandon League, and Tom Wilhelmsen helped him complete the bid. Millwood was put on the disabled list in September with soreness in his shoulder and missed the remainder of the regular season.

Retirement
On February 3, 2013, Millwood was reported to be retiring.

Pitching style
Millwood was a sinkerball pitcher. His sinker clocked at 89–92 mph and was complemented mostly by an 89–91 mph cutter and 83–86 mph slider. Millwood also threw a curveball (71–74) and a changeup (82–84) that he used against left-handed hitters. He tended to use the cutter early in the count, with higher use of his breaking balls in two-strike situations.

Personal life
On January 9, 1999 in Spartanburg, South Carolina, Millwood married Rena Stevens of Greenville, South Carolina.

See also

 List of Major League Baseball annual ERA leaders
 List of Major League Baseball no-hitters
 List of Texas Rangers Opening Day starting pitchers
 List of Major League Baseball career strikeout leaders

References

External links

Curt Schilling at Baseball Almanac

1974 births
Living people
Atlanta Braves players
Philadelphia Phillies players
Cleveland Indians players
Texas Rangers players
Baltimore Orioles players
Colorado Rockies players
Seattle Mariners players
American League ERA champions
Baseball players from North Carolina
Major League Baseball pitchers
National League All-Stars
Baseball players from Atlanta
People from Gastonia, North Carolina
Gulf Coast Braves players
Danville Braves players
Macon Braves players
Greenville Braves players
Durham Bulls players
Richmond Braves players
Frisco RoughRiders players
Trenton Thunder players
Scranton/Wilkes-Barre Yankees players
Pawtucket Red Sox players
People from Bessemer City, North Carolina
American expatriate baseball players in Australia